Kidogo may refer to:

"Kidogo" (song), a 2016 song by Tanzanian singer Diamond Platnumz featuring Nigerian duo P-Square included in his 2018 album A Boy from Tandale 
Kidogo Arthouse, an earlier name of the Old Kerosene Store in Fremantle, Western Australia
A gorilla fathered by Willie B.
A fictional member of the X-Men
A fictional character in Amazing Planet
A lake on the Nyabarongo River